The Rahn curve is a graph used to illustrate an economic theory, proposed in 1996 by American economist Richard W. Rahn, which suggests that there is a level of government spending that maximizes economic growth. The theory is used by classical liberals to argue for a decrease in overall government spending and taxation. The inverted-U-shaped curve suggests that the optimal level of government spending is 15–25% of GDP.

See also 
 Government spending
 Laffer curve
 Tax cut

References

 Pettinger, Tejvan: The Rahn Curve – Economic Growth and Level of Spending, economicshelp.org, April 23, 2008.

External links 
 search "Rahn", freedomandprosperity.org

Economics curves
Fiscal policy